John Cutt (1613 – April 5, 1681) was the first president of the Province of New Hampshire.

Cutt was born in Wales, emigrated to the colonies in 1646, and became a successful merchant and mill owner in Portsmouth, New Hampshire. He was married to Hannah Starr, daughter of Dr. Comfort Starr of Boston, a founder of Harvard College and a surgeon who emigrated from Ashford, Kent, England. Starr is buried in King's Chapel Burying Ground, Boston.

On January 1, 1680, John Cutt became the first president of the royal Province of New Hampshire, when New Hampshire was first separated from the Massachusetts Bay Colony. Cutt was the head of the seven-member royal provincial council. An early copy of the document appointing Cutt and his council is now preserved by the State of New Hampshire.

Soon after his appointment he fell ill. On March 1, 1681, the provincial Council and General Assembly designated March 17, 1681, as a Fast Day, "A day of public fasting and prayer." The Council and Assembly believed Cutt's illness and the recent sighting of a comet were signs of "divine displeasure"; the fast day was unsuccessful, as John Cutt died on April 5, 1681.

After his Cutt's death, Richard Waldron was named acting president.

Family
John Cutt was accompanied from Wales to Portsmouth by two brothers, Richard and Robert. A descendant of brother Robert Cutt was Hon. Hampden Cutts (as the family styled themselves, with the 's' in succeeding generations) of North Hartland, Vermont. Hampden Cutts married Mary Pepperrell Sparhawk Jarvis, daughter of William Jarvis of Weathersfield, Vermont, and the man who introduced merino sheep to America. Cutts's wife Mary Jarvis was herself a descendant of John Cutt through her father.

References

External links
Genealogy of the Cutts family in America (1892)
New Hampshire Almanac: History
John Cutt, Seacoast NH
Commission of John Cutt, 1680, The Avalon Project
Gravestone of Hannah Cutt (nee Starr), wife of John Cutt
The Origin of Robert, Richard and John Cutt, Collections, Historic and Miscellaneous, John Farmer, 1824

1613 births
1681 deaths
Welsh merchants
Welsh emigrants to the United States
Politicians from Portsmouth, New Hampshire
Colonial governors of New Hampshire
17th-century Welsh businesspeople
Colonial American merchants